The South Sulawesi languages are a subgroup of the Austronesian language family. They are primarily spoken in the Indonesian provinces of South Sulawesi and West Sulawesi, with a small outlying pocket in West Kalimantan.

Subgrouping

Internal classification 
This classification follows Grimes & Grimes (1987) and the Ethnologue.
Bugis
Buginese: Buginese, Campalagian
 Tamanic: Embaloh, Taman
Makassaric: Bentong, Coastal Konjo, Highland Konjo, Makassarese, Selayar
Seko: Budong-Budong, Panasuan, Seko Padang, Seko Tengah
Lemolang
Northern
Mamuju
Mandar
Massenrempulu: Duri, Enrekang, Malimpung, Maiwa
Pitu Ulunna Salu: Aralle-Tabulahan, Dakka, Pannei, Bambam, Ulumanda’
Toraja: Kalumpang, Tae’, Mamasa (including Pattae', Central Mamasa, and Northern Mamasa), Toraja-Sa’dan, Talondo’

The position of the Tamanic languages, spoken in West Borneo, was unclear until the end of the last century. The Dutch linguist K.A. Adelaar showed that they are especially close to Buginese and thus can be included in the South Sulawesi subgroup.

Zobel (2020) also classifies the Badaic languages with Seko as part of a Seko–Badaic group within the South Sulawesi branch.

Notes: Italic writing is considered a dialect and not a separate language.

Position within Austronesian 
At the current state of research, the South Sulawesi languages are considered to make up a primary branch of the Malayo-Polynesian subgroup within the Austronesian language family.

South Sulawesi influence in Malagasy
Adelaar (1995) suggested that the vocabulary of Malagasy, next to its basic stratum inherited from Barito and loanwords from Malay, also contains many words that are of South Sulawesi origin. Further evidence was presented by Blench (2018).

Reconstruction

Proto-South Sulawesi (PSS) has been reconstructed by Mills (1975a, 1975b).

Phonology

Vowels

The Proto-South-Sulawesi vowel *ɨ is a reflex of Proto-Malayo-Polynesian (PMP) *ə. It is only preserved in Buginese, in all other languages it mostly became a (but under certain circumstances also i, u, e, and rarely o).

The main sources of the mid vowels are PMP *-iq/*-ay, which became *e, and *-uq/*-aw, which became *o, e.g.
PMP  > PSS  'white'
PMP  > PSS  'dead'
PMP  > PSS  'torch'
PMP  > PSS  'knife'

Consonants

The velar fricative *ɣ only appears in final position as a reflex of PMP *R, while *z only is found in medial position as a reflex of PMP *j.

See also
Languages of Sulawesi
Celebic languages

References

Citations

Bibliography

Further reading

External links
 South Sulawesi at Ethnologue (23rd ed., 2020).
 Classification of Sulawesi Languages

 
Languages of Sulawesi